Hank Brandt (born Henry William Haar Jr.; June 4, 1934 – December 4, 2004) was an American film and television actor. He was known for playing Leonard Waggedorn in the American sitcom television series Julia from 1968 to 1971.

Brandt was born in East Orange, New Jersey. He began his career in 1961, appearing in an episode of the anthology television series Alfred Hitchcock Presents as a police investigator. He continued appearing in films and television programs, including playing the role of the police officer Leonard Waggedorn in the NBC sitcom series Julia (1968–1971).

Brandt guest-starred in numerous television programs including Wagon Train, Mission: Impossible, The F.B.I., Tales of Wells Fargo, Columbo, Hawaii Five-O, The Jack Benny Program, Perry Mason, Barnaby Jones, Gunsmoke and Combat!. He also appeared and co-starred in films such as Telefon, Dumb and Dumber, Kingpin, Soldier Boyz and Escape from Alcatraz. Brandt also played the recurring role of Morgan Hess in the prime time TV soap opera Dynasty from 1982 to 1988. He narrated the syndicated reality television program LAPD: Life on the Beat from 1996 until 1999. His final credit was in the 2004 film 50 Ways to Leave Your Lover.

Brandt died in December 2004, in North Hills, California, at the age of 70.

References

External links 

Rotten Tomatoes profile

1934 births
2004 deaths
People from East Orange, New Jersey
Male actors from New Jersey
American male film actors
American male television actors
American male soap opera actors
20th-century American male actors